Dr Duncan Joseph McVey (died 2010) was a New Zealand footballer who represented New Zealand at international level.

McVey made a solitary official international appearance for New Zealand in a 4–1 win over New Caledonia on 2 June 1962, McVey and Trefor Pugh scoring twice each for New Zealand.

References 

2010 deaths
New Zealand association footballers
New Zealand international footballers
1938 births
Association football inside forwards